Abraxis may refer to:
 Abraxis BioScience, a wholly owned biopharmaceutical subsidiary of the biotechnology company Celgene
 Abraxis, a fictional spacecraft, the primary setting for the animated film Dead Space: Aftermath
 Creeper World 3: Abraxis, a video game in the Creeper World franchise
 Abraxis, the name of the primary character in the Necropolis video game
 Abraxis, an extra-dimensional being from the 1991–92 DC Comics storyline "Armageddon Inferno"
 Abraxis, a 3-D-puzzle, 64 small cubes fixed to 13 parts combine to a 4x4x4 cube
 Abraxis, a psy-trance trio formed by Seven Lions and Dimibo.

See also
 The Abraxis Wren Chronicles
 ABRIXAS
 Abraxas (disambiguation)